William Stephens (Progressive) resigned July 22, 1916 to become Lieutenant Governor of California.

Henry S. Benedict ( Republican) was elected November 7, 1916 to finish the term.

Benedict was also nominated as a Progressive for the next term, but withdrew in favor of the Republican.

References 
 https://www.ourcampaigns.com/RaceDetail.html?RaceID=114906

See also 
 1916 United States House of Representatives elections

California 1916 10
California 1916 10
1916 10 Special
California 10 Special
United States House of Representatives 10 Special
United States House of Representatives 1916 10